II is the second album from the folk/indie rock collaboration project by folk artist Kevin Devine and members of indie rock band Manchester Orchestra. It was released on October 9, 2012, exactly two years after the band's self-titled debut album, on Triple Crown Records. Like the first album, the songs written were collaborations between Kevin Devine and Manchester Orchestra's frontman Andy Hull.

Announcement on the album's title, release date and new label took place on the band's Facebook page on August 12, 2012. The next day, on August 13, the band streamed the first single off the album, "Forest Whitaker", for free on the Rolling Stone website, and on August 22, the single was released as an official digital single on iTunes.

On September 19, 2012, the band streamed the song "It Never Stops", exclusively through AbsolutePunk.

Track listing

Personnel 
Kevin Devine - lead vocals, guitar, piano	
Andy Hull - lead vocals, guitar, piano	
Robert McDowell - lead guitar, backing vocals	
Chris Freeman - keyboards, backing vocals
Jonathan Corley - bass
Ben Homola - drums, percussion

References 

	

2012 albums
Bad Books albums
Triple Crown Records albums